Rettaisuzhi is a 2010 Indian Tamil-language drama film written and directed by Thamira. It stars filmmakers K. Balachander and Bharathiraja along with Anjali, Aari Arujunan, Jayachitra, Karunas, Manobala, and Ilavarasu in supporting roles. The film released on 23 April 2010.

Plot
The film unfolds in a village in Thirunelveli. Ramasamy (K. Balachander) is an influential man in the village, and he is a devoted to the principles of Congress since his childhood. He is against Singaravelan (Bharathiraja), a Communist. Their feud runs for over four decades. Even their grandchildren are against each other and they form gangs to express their enmity. However, a romance in the family changes the warm atmosphere. Susheela (Anjali), brought up in Singaravelan's house, is a school teacher who is in love with Murthy (Aari Arujunan). Understanding their true love, the children forget their enmity and try to bring both families together and get them married. Whether they succeed in their attempts forms the climax.

Cast
 K. Balachander as Ramaswamy
 Bharathiraja as Singaravelan
 Aari Arujunan as Murthy
 Anjali as Susheela
 Jayachitra as Murthy's mother
 Manobala
 Karunas
 Ilavarasu
 Leema Babu as Singaravelan's granddaughter
 Kambam Meena as Singaravelan's daughter-in-law
 Rinson Simon as Young Murthy

Soundtrack

Soundtrack was composed by Karthik Raja.

Reception
The film had a huge hype prior to its release due to Tamil cinema veterans, K.Balachander and Bharathiraja, coming together for the first time together in a film. The film received poor reviews for its mediocre script, amateurish screenplay, acting and non-existing entertainment factor. Sify labelled it as "a big bore", and The New Indian Express called it "Fairly neatly crafted, Rettai Suzhi is a clean, simple, warm entertainer sans overt glamour, double entendres or mindless violence".

References

External links
 

2010 films
2010s Tamil-language films
Indian comedy-drama films
2010 directorial debut films
Films scored by Karthik Raja